Proof-theoretic semantics is an approach to the semantics of logic that attempts to locate the meaning of propositions and logical connectives not in terms of interpretations, as in Tarskian approaches to semantics, but in the role that the proposition or logical connective plays within the system of inference.

Overview

Gerhard Gentzen is the founder of proof-theoretic semantics, providing the formal basis for it in his account of cut-elimination for the sequent calculus, and some provocative philosophical remarks about locating the meaning of logical connectives in their introduction rules within natural deduction. The history of proof-theoretic semantics since then has been devoted to exploring the consequences of these ideas.

Dag Prawitz extended Gentzen's notion of analytic proof to natural deduction, and suggested that the value of a proof in natural deduction may be understood as its normal form.  This idea lies at the basis of the Curry–Howard isomorphism, and of intuitionistic type theory.  His inversion principle lies at the heart of most modern accounts of proof-theoretic semantics.

Michael Dummett introduced the very fundamental idea of logical harmony, building on a suggestion of Nuel Belnap.  In brief, a language, which is understood to be associated with certain patterns of inference, has logical harmony if it is always possible to recover analytic proofs from arbitrary demonstrations, as can be shown for the sequent calculus by means of cut-elimination theorems and for natural deduction by means of normalisation theorems.  A language that lacks logical harmony will suffer from the existence of incoherent forms of inference: it will likely be inconsistent.

See also

 Inferential role semantics
 Truth-conditional semantics

References

 Proof-Theoretic Semantics, at the Stanford Encyclopedia of Philosophy
 Logical Consequence, Deductive-Theoretic Conceptions, at the Internet Encyclopedia of Philosophy.
 Nissim Francez, "On a Distinction of Two Facets of Meaning and its Role in Proof-theoretic Semantics", Logica Universalis 9, 2015. 
 Thomas Piecha, Peter Schroeder-Heister (eds), "Advances in Proof-Theoretic Semantics", Trends in Logic 43, Springer, 2016.

External links

Arché Bibliography on Proof-Theoretic Semantics.

Mathematical logic
Philosophical logic
Proof theory
Semantics